The Church of Christ in China Heep Woh College is a Christian secondary school in Tsz Wan Shan, Kowloon, Hong Kong. The college is a standard grammar school founded by The Hong Kong Council of the Church of Christ in China. The school hosts a student body of approximately 1200, aged 11 to 20, with 57 teachers. Most courses are taught in English.

History 
In 1911,  Mrs. Lear Bigelow, from the United States, founded the Heep Woh Kindergarten in Xiguan, Guangzhou, dedicating to early childhood education. In 1947 and 1970 respectively, the Hong Kong Council of the Church of Christ in China established  CCC Heep Woh Primary School and CCC Heep Woh College.

In 1998, a management committee was created to supervise school operation and set targets and priorities of school development. This committee is composed of School Supervisor, Principal, Vice-Principals, representatives of teachers, parents, alumni and the C.C.C.

School badge
The school badge consists of two main parts - the shield and the ribbon. The former comprises the open bible with the Greek words "Jesus is the Christ", the "Nestorian Cross", the seal with the school name written in Chinese clerical script and the interconnected three "Cs". The latter incorporates the name of the school in English.

External links
 
 Book of school

Hong Kong Council of the Church of Christ in China
Tsz Wan Shan
Protestant secondary schools in Hong Kong